Harry's House is the third studio album by English singer and songwriter Harry Styles, released on 20 May 2022 by Columbia Records and Erskine. The album was largely written and recorded during 2020 and 2021 and has been noted as Styles' most introspective work. Inspired by the 1970s Japanese city pop, Harry's House is a pop-funk, pop rock and synth-pop album.

The album debuted with the best first-week sales in Styles' career. It debuted at number one on the UK Albums Chart with 113,000 album-equivalent units, becoming the fastest-selling and best-selling album of 2022 in the country. It also debuted at number one on the US Billboard 200 with 521,500 album-equivalent units, including 330,000 album sales, making it the largest opening week of 2022 in the United States. It debuted at number one in various other countries, including Australia, Belgium, Canada, France, Germany, Ireland, Italy, the Netherlands, New Zealand, Spain, Sweden and Switzerland.

Harrys House was met with critical acclaim for its production. It was supported by the singles "As It Was", "Late Night Talking", and "Music for a Sushi Restaurant"; the first of which debuted atop the UK and US charts, becoming Styles' second solo number-one song in both countries. Besides the chart-topper "As It Was", three other songs were concurrently in the top 10 of the US Billboard Hot 100: "Late Night Talking", "Music for a Sushi Restaurant" and "Matilda", making Styles the first British solo artist to achieve this feat.  The album was nominated for the 2022 Mercury Music Prize. At the 2023 Brit Awards, the album won Album of the Year. At the 65th Grammy Awards, the album won Album of the Year and Best Pop Vocal Album.

Background and production
In an interview with Apple Music, Styles explained how he came up with the album title: "The album is named after Haruomi Hosono, he had an album in the '70s called , and I spent that chunk in Japan; I heard that record and I was like 'I love that.[...] It'd be really fun to make a record called Harry's House'." The initial idea behind the album came when Styles wanted to take the title in a literal way so he could make an acoustic extended play recorded at his own house. The album is considered Styles's most introspective of his career thus fair; according to Styles the central concept of 'house' is a metaphor for the inside of his mind rather than a "geographical location". Speaking on the album's concept, Styles said "It was much more of an internal thing… [and] it felt like it took on this whole new meaning and it was about, like: imagine, it’s a day in my house, what do I go through? A day in my mind, what do I go through? In my house I’m playing fun music, sad music, I’m playing this, I’m playing that. It’s a day in the life."

The album was largely written and recorded during 2020 and 2021. "Boyfriends", however, was initially written during the final week of Fine Line (2019) recording. The first song to be written for the album was "Late Night Talking", which was written the day Styles, the band and the producers arrived at Shangri-La studios in Malibu. "Matilda" is titled after the lead character from a book of the same name, written by Roald Dahl. The song was inspired by a relationship Styles had with someone who was going through difficulty. In an interview with Zane Lowe, Style's stated he wrote the song to show he was listening: "Sometimes it's just about listening. I hope that's what I did here. If nothing else, it just says, 'I was listening to you'". The album features John Mayer on lead guitar on "Cinema" and "Daydreaming".

"Boyfriends" lyrically discusses the experience of romantic relationships in which "people don't treat each other very nicely sometimes" that Styles observed in his sister and friends when dating other people as well as his own experiences with dating. "Cinema" was Styles's "fun" track which he started writing while being on the treadmill and continued writing piecewise. "Love of My Life" is Styles's way of showing his love and appreciation to England and home.

Composition
Musically, Harrys House takes influence from Japan's 1970s-80s city pop genre, and primarily features pop-funk, pop rock, synth-pop songs, with elements of R&B. Jon Dolan of Rolling Stone described the album's musical sound as "bright", especially the production's use of synths and horns over synth-pop and R&B songs.

Release and promotion
Styles announced the title of his upcoming third studio album as Harry's House on 23 March 2022, unveiling its artwork, a 40-second trailer and the album's release date of 20 May 2022. In the trailer, Styles steps on the podium of a theatre and grins while a "house façade" rises near him and reversed synthesisers play in the background; the audio would later be revealed to be a backwards version of the album's closing track, "Love of My Life". Joni Mitchell, whose 1975 album The Hissing of Summer Lawns featured a track called "Harry's House / Centerpiece", tweeted that she "love[d] the title". Upon announcing the album, Styles set up an interactive website and a new Twitter account. The messages published included "you are home" and "in this world, it's just us, you know it's not the same as it was". The album was released on 20 May 2022 through Erskine and Columbia.

On 15 April 2022, during his Coachella headlining performance, Styles performed "As It Was" live for the first time, in addition to two then-unreleased songs from the album, "Boyfriends" and "Late Night Talking".

One month before the album's release, Harry's House was reportedly leaked on Twitter in its entirety. Sony, owner of Columbia Records, publicly condemned the leak in a tweet.

On 26 May 2022, in a segment on The Late Late Show with James Corden, Styles and James Corden filmed a music video for the song "Daylight" directed by the latter, in which they visit an apartment belonging to some fans. Both the music video and segment were released on the show's YouTube channel on 28 May 2022.

Singles
"As It Was" was released as the lead single of Harry's House on 1 April 2022, having been previously announced on 28 March 2022. "As It Was" debuted atop the UK and US charts, becoming his second solo number one single in both countries, and reached the top of Australian and Canadian charts.

"Late Night Talking" was released to US pop radio on 21 June 2022, as the album's second single. It reached the top five on American, Australian, British and Canadian charts.

"Music for a Sushi Restaurant" was released to adult contemporary radio on 3 October 2022, as the album's third single. It peaked in the top ten on American, Australian, British and Canadian charts prior to its release as a single.

Critical reception

Harry's House was met with critical acclaim. At Metacritic, which assigns a normalised rating out of 100 to reviews from professional publications, the album received an average score of 83 based on 26 reviews, indicating "universal acclaim"—Styles' highest rated album.

Veteran critic Robert Christgau applauded the album's musical fluidity while stating, "Even more remarkable is the way the lyrics this soundscape cushion and accentuate achieve a metaphorical reach and narrative concreteness truly rare in megapop." Alexis Petridis of The Guardian wrote that the album "ticks a lot of the right boxes and has abundant charm, which makes it a perfect reflection of the pop star who made it". Reviewing the album for DIY, Emma Swann felt that while Styles alternately spends time "exploring vivid lyrical micro-vignettes" and then "obfuscating" the narrative on the album, he is "also not scared of being secondary to the song; a lesson it's taken many others far longer to learn". Neil Z. Yeung from AllMusic stated that "Harry's House is what happens when Styles steps out of the spotlight to live his life. And despite the fact that there's nothing as immortal as 'Watermelon Sugar' to be found, this album, as a whole, has solid bones and is sturdy enough to last."

Commercial performance
Two hours after the album was released on Apple Music, Harry's House earned the most first-day streams for a pop album released in 2022. In the United Kingdom, the album debuted at number one on the UK Albums chart with 113,000 album-equivalent units, becoming Styles' second number-one album and the fastest-selling album of 2022 so far.

In the United States, Harry's House debuted at number one on the Billboard 200 chart with 521,500 units, consisting of 330,000 pure sales and 189,000 streaming units (from the 246.96 million on-demand streams of the album's tracks). It became Styles' third US number-one album, his biggest debut in the country, and the second-largest opening week for an album in 2022, behind Taylor Swift's Midnights. Additionally, it set a modern-era record for single-week vinyl album sales in the US, selling 182,000 copies, and marked the second-largest week for an album on vinyl since Luminate began tracking music sales in 1991. Harry's House notched a second consecutive week at number one, with 160,500 units sold, becoming his second album to spend multiple weeks atop the charts after 2019's Fine Line and the first album to spend its first two weeks at number one since Adele's 30 spent its first six weeks at number one from late 2021 through to early 2022. With the entire tracklist charting within the top 15 of the ARIA Charts, the album set a new record in Australia.

Besides the chart-topper "As It Was", three other songs reached the top 10 of the US Billboard Hot 100: "Late Night Talking" (at number four), "Music for a Sushi Restaurant" (at number eight) and "Matilda" (at number nine). With four concurrent top-ten hits on the chart, this made Styles the first British solo artist to achieve this, and among all British acts he joins the Beatles, who achieved the feat in 1964.

Accolades 
Harry's House was included in various best-of lists of 2022 albums.

Awards and nominations

Track listing

Notes

Personnel

Musicians

 Harry Styles – lead vocals (all tracks), whistles (3), glockenspiel (4, 10), keyboards (11)
 Alayna Rodgers – background vocals (1, 2, 8, 9)
 India Boodram – background vocals (1, 2, 8, 9)
 Mitch Rowland – bass guitar, percussion (1); drums (4, 10), electric guitar (10)
 Kid Harpoon – drum machine (1, 2, 4–6, 10, 13), electric guitar (1–6, 8–11, 13), synthesizer (1, 2, 4–6, 8–11, 13), bass guitar (2–11, 13); programming, tambourine (2); drums (3, 4, 8, 9, 11), keyboards (3, 8, 10), piano (3, 7), acoustic guitar (6, 7, 13), percussion (8)
 Tyler Johnson – drum machine (1, 3–6, 8, 10, 13), electric guitar (1, 5, 6), synthesizer (1, 4–11, 13), background vocals (2, 5, 9), programming (2, 3, 13), horn (3), keyboards (3, 9–11), piano (4, 9, 13), bass guitar (8, 10, 11), organ (9, 11)
 Ivan Jackson – trumpet (1)
 Rob Harris – bass guitar, electric guitar (3)
 Hal Ritson – programming (3)
 Jeremy Hatcher – programming (3–5, 8, 11, 13), electric guitar (11)
 Richard Adlam – programming (3)
 Doug Showalter – electric guitar, percussion (4)
 Pino Palladino – bass guitar (6, 9)
 Dev Hynes – cello (7)
 Joshua Johnson – saxophone (7)
 John Mayer – electric guitar (8, 9)
 Sammy Witte – programming, synthesizer (8)
 Cole Kamen-Green – horn (9)
 Ivan Jackson – horn (9)
 Sarah Jones – percussion (10)
 Ben Harper – acoustic guitar, electric guitar, slide guitar (12)

Technical

 Kid Harpoon – Production (all tracks)
 Tyler Johnson – Production (all tracks)
 Samuel Witte – Production (8), engineering (6, 8)
 Randy Merrill – mastering
 Spike Stent – mixing
 Jeremy Hatcher – engineering
 Oli Jacobs – engineering (1, 6, 10)
 Hal Ritson – engineering (3)
 Richard Adlam – engineering (3)
 Nick Lobel – engineering (11), vocal engineering (10)
 Joe Dougherty – engineering assistance
 Josh Caulder – engineering assistance
 Matt Wolach – engineering assistance
 Adele Phillips – engineering assistance (1–11, 13)
 Luke Gibbs – engineering assistance (1–11, 13)
 Katie May – engineering assistance (1, 3, 4, 6, 8, 10, 13)
 Oli Middleton – engineering assistance (1, 6, 10)
 Garry Purohit – engineering assistance (2, 3, 5–7, 9)
 Matt Tuggle – engineering assistance (6)
 Brian Rajartnam – engineering assistance (8)

Art
 Molly Hawkins – creative director
 Hanna Moon – photography
 Harry Lambert – styling
 Patience Harding – set decoration
 Bradley Pinkerton – graphic design

Charts

Weekly charts

Year-end charts

Certifications and sales

Release history

See also

 List of Billboard 200 number-one albums of 2022
 List of number-one albums from the 2020s (Denmark)
 List of number-one albums from the 2020s (New Zealand)
 List of number-one albums in Norway
 List of number-one albums of 2022 (Australia)
 List of number-one albums of 2022 (Canada)
 List of number-one albums of 2022 (Finland)
 List of number-one albums of 2022 (Ireland)
 List of number-one albums of 2022 (Poland)
 List of number-one albums of 2022 (Portugal)
 List of number-one albums of 2022 (Spain)
 List of number-one albums of the 2020s (Czech Republic)
 List of number-one hits of 2022 (France)
 List of number-one hits of 2022 (Germany)
 List of number-one hits of 2022 (Italy)
 List of number-one singles and albums in Sweden
 List of UK Albums Chart number ones of the 2020s
 Scottish Singles and Albums Charts

Footnotes

References

2022 albums
Harry Styles albums
Albums produced by Kid Harpoon
Albums produced by Tyler Johnson (musician)
Columbia Records albums
Albums recorded at Shangri-La (recording studio)
Grammy Award for Album of the Year
Grammy Award for Best Pop Vocal Album
Grammy Award for Best Engineered Album, Non-Classical
Juno Award for International Album of the Year albums